Maplewood Academy is a private Christian boarding high school located 

in Hutchinson, Minnesota. It is owned and operated by the Minnesota Conference of Seventh-day Adventists. It is a part of the Seventh-day Adventist education system, the world's second largest Christian school system.

History
The school's history traces to 1888 when the Minnesota Conference of Seventh-day Adventists opened the Minneapolis Preparatory School in the basement of the new Minneapolis Church on the northwest corner of 4th Avenue and Lake Street. In August 1889, The Minnesota Conference Committee decided the school needed to be expanded, so the school moved to a rented three-story hotel on Main and Ferry Streets in Anoka and was renamed the Minneapolis Industrial School. In 1904, a 94-acre farm near Maple Plain was purchased as the site for the Minnesota Industrial School. The move of the school to the new location also brought a name change: Maplewood Academy. The school commenced in 1904 with seven faculty members and 57 students in attendance. The Seventh-day Adventist General Conference Committee voted in 1928 to unite the academy with the Hutchinson Theological Seminary (MN).

The yearly cost is about $18,000 per child.

See also

 List of Seventh-day Adventist secondary schools
 Seventh-day Adventist education

References

External links

Adventist secondary schools in the United States
Private high schools in Minnesota
Educational institutions established in 1888
Schools in McLeod County, Minnesota
1888 establishments in Minnesota